Sowina  is a village in the administrative district of Gmina Kołaczyce, within Jasło County, Subcarpathian Voivodeship, in south-eastern Poland.

The village has a population of 1,000.

References

Villages in Jasło County